Óli Þorbjörn Guðbjartsson (born 27 August 1935) is an Icelandic politician and former minister.

External links
 Non auto-biography of Óli Þorbjörn Guðbjartsson on the parliament website 

Oli Thorbjorn Gudbjartsson
Living people
1935 births
Place of birth missing (living people)
20th-century Icelandic politicians